Justin Michael Cornwell (born November 5, 1988) is an American actor, writer and musician best known for playing Young Jeronicus Jangle in the hit Netflix original movie Jingle Jangle, Marcus Hargreeves in The Umbrella Academy and Kyle Craig in the CBS crime drama, Training Day, based on the 2001 film of the same name.

Early life and education
Cornwell was born in Sharon, Pennsylvania to Sidney Cornwell and Robin Bodiford. However, he was primarily raised in Cleveland, Ohio and Louisville, Kentucky. At age 10, he relocated with his mother and stepfather Jackie Herring (died 2009) to Louisville where he was encouraged to pursue art after first showing an interest in grade school. He graduated from Eastern High School where he participated in chorus and school plays. He was named as a premier student artist at the Muhammad Ali Center. He attended the University of Louisville where he continued studying acting. Cornwell relocated to Chicago in 2011 to pursue his acting career.

Career
Cornwell found work at the Chicago Shakespeare Theatre where he appeared in "Othello the Remix", "A Mid Summers Night Dream" and other Chicago theatre productions shortly after being signed by Gray Talent Group. While constantly working in theater and on the crew of TV shows Justin booked appearances in commercials for Walmart and the Ohio Lottery. In 2014, Cornwell appeared in an episode of the NBC crime drama, "Chicago P.D". In 2015, he appeared in an episode of Fox's hit musical drama, Empire and later had an uncredited appearance in Spike Lee's "Chi-Raq". In March 2016, Cornwell was cast in the pilot for the CBS drama "Training Day", based on the 2001 film of the same name. It went to series but was cancelled after the untimely death of Cornwell's co-lead Bill Paxton, airing all 13 episodes of its sole season.
In 2017 Cornwell was cast in the TNT limited series "I Am the Night", produced by Patty Jenkins and Chris Pine, which aired its limited run in January 2019. That same year also saw Cornwell star in the NBC supernatural crime drama, "The InBetween", which ended its run after only one season. In the fall of 2020 Cornwell appeared in the event musical "Jingle Jangle" for Netflix as young Jeronicus Jangle performing the opening song This Day in the film. In January of 2021 it was announced that Cornwell would be joining the season 3 of hit Netflix series "The Umbrella Academy (TV series)" as the leader of an alternate group of super powered siblings called the Sparrow Academy. As of June 2021 Cornwell was announced as a lead in Gareth Evans Netflix action thriller "Havoc" starring alongside Tom Hardy and Forest Whitaker.

Personal life 
Justin married his longtime girlfriend Lindsey Jones on 7 September 2019.

Filmography

Movies

Television

Video games

References
6. Timothy Olyphant, Justin Cornwell and Others Join Tom Hardy in Netflix Action Thriller ‘Havoc’ (EXCLUSIVE) By Rebecca Rubin, Patrick Frater

External links
 

1988 births
American male television actors
Living people
University of Louisville alumni
People from Sharon, Pennsylvania
Male actors from Louisville, Kentucky
Eastern High School (Louisville, Kentucky) alumni